Maurice Copeland (June 13, 1911 – October 3, 1985) was an American actor. He had supporting roles in films such as Arthur, The Pope of Greenwich Village and Trading Places.

Copeland was a member of the Pasadena Community Players troupe. On Broadway, Copeland appeared in The Freedom of the City (1974), First Monday in October (1978), and Morning's at Seven (1980).

Filmography

Film

Television

References

External links

People from Rector, Arkansas
Male actors from New Rochelle, New York
1911 births
1985 deaths